Jesús Tortosa Cabrera  (born 21 December 1997 in Madrid) is a Spanish taekwondo athlete.

Tortosa first drew attention in March 2014 when he won the gold medal in the under 51 kg division at the World Junior Taekwondo Championships held in Taipei City, Taiwan.
In May 2014, Tortosa made his senior debut at the European Taekwondo Championships in Baku, Azerbaijan where he won bronze in the men's finweight (under 54 kg) division.

In June 2015, the 17-year-old boy competed in the inaugural European Games held in Baku, Azerbaijan. Originally a finweight, Tortosa captured the silver medal in the men's 58 kg division.  Although he lost to Rui Bragança of Portugal 6-5 in the final,  he dominated three-time European champion Levent Tuncat of Germany 17-5 in the semifinals.

In 2016, he won the silver medal in the 2016 European Taekwondo Olympic Qualification Tournament, in Istanbul, Turkey, losing to gold medalist Ron Atias of Israel in the final.

References

External links
 

Spanish male taekwondo practitioners
Living people
1997 births
Taekwondo practitioners at the 2014 Summer Youth Olympics
Taekwondo practitioners at the 2015 European Games
European Games medalists in taekwondo
European Games silver medalists for Spain
Taekwondo practitioners at the 2016 Summer Olympics
Olympic taekwondo practitioners of Spain
Mediterranean Games gold medalists for Spain
Mediterranean Games medalists in taekwondo
Competitors at the 2018 Mediterranean Games
European Taekwondo Championships medalists
World Taekwondo Championships medalists
21st-century Spanish people